Gunasekera or Gunasekara is a Sinhalese surname. Notable people with the surname include:

People
 Abraham Mendis Gunasekera (1869–1931), Ceylonese writer
 Basil Gunasekara (born 1929), Sri Lankan navy officer
 C. I. Gunasekera (1920–2010), Sri Lankan cricketer
 Churchill Gunasekara (1894–1969), Ceylonese cricketer
 D. E. W. Gunasekera (born 1935), Sri Lankan politician
 Deepal Gunasekara, Sri Lankan politician
 Earl Gunasekara (born 1960), Sri Lankan politician
 Edward Gunasekara, Sri Lankan politician
 Frank Gunasekera, Ceylonese politician
 H. M. Gunasekera, Sri Lankan broadcaster
 Hemal Gunasekara (born 1959), Sri Lankan politician
 Kapila Gunasekara, Sri Lankan academic
 Maiya Gunasekara, Sri Lankan physician and rugby player
 Pasan Gunasekera (1964–1995), Sri Lankan soldier
 R. M. Padma Udhaya Shantha Gunasekera, Sri Lankan politician
 Romesh Gunesekera (born 1954), British author
 Ruvindu Gunasekera (born 1991), Sri Lankan cricketer
 Tudor Gunasekara (born 1935), Sri Lankan politician and diplomat
 U. N. Gunasekera, Sri Lankan civil engineer
 Valentine Gunasekara (born 1931), Sri Lankan architect
 Victor Gunasekara (1921–1993), Ceylonese civil servant
 Yohan Goonasekera (born 1957), Sri Lankan cricketer

Other uses
 Gunasekara - a spider genus with single species endemic to Sri Lanka.

See also
 
 
 
 

Sinhalese surnames